John Rawls (1921–2002) was an American moral and political philosopher.

John Rawls may also refer to: 
 John Rawls (actor) (born 1972), actor from New Zealand
 John S. Rawls (1921–1993), American politician in Florida
 John F. Rawls, American developmental biologist
John Rawls, a character in the musical A Theory of Justice: The Musical!